Nestor-Guillermo progeria syndrome is an extremely rare novel genetic disorder that is part of a group of syndromes called progeria. This disorder is characterized by the same symptoms of other progeria syndromes, which are premature aging with accompanying aged physical appearance, osteolysis, osteoporosis, scoliosis and lipoatrophy, however, what makes this disorder unique from other progeroid syndromes is the absence of any atherosclerotic, cardiovascular, and metabolic symptoms/complications, this makes the life-span of a person with NGPS somewhat longer than the average life-span of someone with progeria itself, although in place of the complications mentioned above, there's also additional symptoms, such as joint stiffness, growth retardation, facial dysmorphisms, wide cranial sutures, micrognathia, atrophic skin and a high risk of developing severe skeletal abnormalities

This syndrome is caused by mutations in the BANF1 gene, in chromosome 11q13.1, and is inherited in an autosomal recessive pattern

Discovery 

This rare disorder was discovered when 2 seemingly healthy twin boys named Nestor and Guillermo were born in Spain, starting at the age of 2, they rapidly started aging, when they were 10 years old, they had lost their hair, their skin started wrinkling, their bones started weaking and their stature barely increased, it was clear they had progeria; however, their doctors couldn't find what type of progeria they had, since they didn't present cardiovascular abnormalities and they didn't have the known genetic mutations of the mentioned progeroid syndromes, that's when their shared genetic mutations (BANF1) were discovered, and with that discovery came the revelation of a novel progeroid syndrome, by 2011, they were already 20–30 years old.

References 

Progeroid syndromes